George Alexander Thompson (23 March 1884 – 1950) was an English footballer and manager who managed Luton Town for eight months during 1925. Turning professional in 1906, he turned out for Sheffield United, Derby County and Newcastle United before moving into management.

References

External links

1884 births
Year of death missing
Footballers from South Shields
English footballers
Association football outside forwards
South Shields F.C. (1889) players
North Shields F.C. players
Sheffield United F.C. players
Derby County F.C. players
Newcastle United F.C. players
English Football League players
English football managers
Luton Town F.C. managers
Association football midfielders